Li Jieqiang (born 25 May 1959) is a Chinese hurdler. He competed in the men's 110 metres hurdles at the 1984 Summer Olympics.

References

1959 births
Living people
Athletes (track and field) at the 1984 Summer Olympics
Chinese male hurdlers
Olympic athletes of China
Place of birth missing (living people)